Croton guatemalensis, known as copalchi, is a plant species of the genus Croton.

It is found in Guatemala, in Central America.

References

External links

guatemalensis
Flora of Guatemala
Plants described in 1895
Taxa named by Johannes Paulus Lotsy